Lokot is an urban locality (a work settlement) and the administrative center of the Brasovsky District of Bryansk Oblast, Russia. Population:

See also 
Lokot Autonomy

References

Notes

Sources

Urban-type settlements in Bryansk Oblast